Roman Romanovych Laba (born 30 November 1966) is a Ukrainian former football striker, and currently interim coach of Lviv in the Ukrainian First League.

Coaching career
After he retired from playing football, he was invited to work as an assistant coach in 1996.

At the end of June 2011, Laba became the new interim coach of FC Lviv in the Ukrainian First League.

References

External links
 

1966 births
Living people
Sportspeople from Lviv Oblast
Lviv State University of Physical Culture alumni
Soviet footballers
Ukrainian footballers
Association football forwards
FC Zirka Berdychiv players
FC Volyn Lutsk players
FC Karpaty Lviv players
FC Bukovyna Chernivtsi players
NK Veres Rivne players
FC Podillya Khmelnytskyi players
FC Skala Stryi (1911) players
FC Kremin Kremenchuk players
SC Skify Lviv players
FC Hazovyk Komarno players
Soviet Second League players
Ukrainian Premier League players
Ukrainian First League players
Ukrainian Second League players
Ukrainian Amateur Football Championship players
Ukrainian football managers
FC Lviv managers
Ukrainian First League managers